Ever After is a novel by British author Graham Swift published in 1992 by Picador, containing 'repeated intertextual invocations' of Hamlet.

Plot
Academic Bill Unwin sits in his college room, recovering from his suicide attempt and thinking back over his life. Starting with his childhood in Paris where his aloof father successfully committed suicide, and his mother had a relationship with an American, Sam who made a fortune in plastics and  then became his stepfather. The narration them moves to 1950's Soho where Bill marries Ruth, an actress who later dies of lung cancer. Throughout his life Bill never reconciled himself to his successful stepfather, who attempts and fails to build bridges with Bill. The other strand is the private notebooks of a Victorian predecessor Matthew Pearce which are entrusted to Bill. They notebooks show the breakdown of his relationship with his wife and father-in-law over his unshakeable belief in Darwinism, and Bill tries to square them with his own identity.

Reception
According to The Guardian, Ever After met with 'indifferent reviews'.
Stephen Wall writing in London Review of Books concludes that "In the end, and despite its manifestly humane intentions, the different areas of narrative interest in Ever After disperse rather than concentrate attention. Although its varying strands are conscientiously knitted together (so that, for instance, the fellowship which allows Unwin to edit Matthew’s diaries is endowed by Sam), they don’t seem significantly to cohere. The histories of hero, his father, and his Victorian antecedent, can be vivid and affecting in detail, but the jumps from one to the other become unsettling. It would be unfair to the novel’s workmanship to say, echoing James’s almost too famous phrase, that its internal relations stop nowhere, but proliferation does appear to get the better of purpose."
Richard Eder in Los Angeles Times is similarly unimpressed: "“Ever After” is almost entirely cerebral, and that would be fine. But it is more cerebral than intelligent. Unwin’s groping, though voiced in a semblance of donnish wit and paradox, is not genuinely interesting. When he breaks through to speak openly of his passions underneath, it is hard to credit them. They lack urgency; they are the pretext for a philosophical puzzle rather than the engenderer of one. Pearce, glimpsed more sketchily, seems a little more real."

References

External links
Ever After : a Study in Intertextuality

1992 British novels
Novels by Graham Swift
Picador (imprint) books